Daniela Simpson (born May 11, 1976) is a marketing executive and an American businesswoman of Czech descent. She is currently the General Manager at Ferrara Candy Company, and is a two-time winner of the Most Innovative New Product Award in the non-chocolate category at the National Confectioners Association Sweets & Snacks Expo.

Career
Daniela Simpson is currently the General Manager at the Ferrera Candy Company, overseeing their US$1.1 billion candy and fruit snacks business unit. She joined Ferrera after playing a key role in the sale of the Nestlé Confections & Snacks business, which sold to Ferrera for US$2.8 billion in January, 2018.

At Nestlé, where Simpson served as Marketing Director, she oversaw a $500 million portfolio of brands. Simpson notably led the creation of the US$100 million Skinny Cow chocolate business, which was included on Nielsen's list of 14 Breakthrough Innovations of the Year in 2013.

Memberships and Associations

Simpson serves on the board of directors of Purpics.

Honors and awards

Daniela has earned two Most Innovative New Product Awards at the yearly National Confectioners Association Sweets & Snacks Expo. In 2016 she and her team received the award for Nerds Lucha Grande and in 2018 she won for Big Chewy Nerds.

Simpson is a frequent guest lecturer at Pepperdine Graziadio Business School.

Education
Simpson's undergraduate degree is in marketing from University of Economics, Prague and she received her MBA from UCLA Anderson School of Management.

Personal
Daniela is married to Aaron Simpson, an animation producer.

References

1976 births
Living people
American people of Czech descent
Prague University of Economics and Business alumni
American marketing people
20th-century American businesspeople
UCLA Anderson School of Management alumni